Sakao (also Nkep or Nekep) is an Oceanic language spoken on the northeast horn of Espiritu Santo, Vanuatu.

Name
Sakao is the name of the language as used by foreigners and linguists. It is named after Sakao Island, an islet off the northeastern shore of Espiritu Santo, almost opposite Port-Olry. (Incidentally, this is not the native name of that island, which is called Laðhi by Sakao speakers. The name sakau means ‘coral reef’ in various languages of Vanuatu, but it is unknown exactly which one gave its name to the island.)

The speakers of Sakao refer to their own language using various names, depending on the variety considered.

Dialects
Sakao has undergone considerable phonological change and innovations, which make it utterly unintelligible to its closely related neighbours of Espiritu Santo. Thus for instance, comparing the following words with their cognates in its close relative Tolomako:

The main dialects of Sakao are Northern, or Port-Olry dialect, and Southern, or Hog-Harbour dialect. The Southern dialect is the more conservative one. It is characterized by the loss of most pretonic and posttonic vowels, resulting in consonant clusters unusual for an Oceanic language. The Northern dialect is characterized by its extensive use of epenthetic vowels, which have achieved phonemic status, resulting in what looks superficially like vowel harmony; the loss of the initial *n- of nouns, except in monosyllabic nouns (this *n- being a reflex of the common Austronesian article *na, fused to the nouns in Sakao); and the diphthongization of some word-final vowels.

Thus for instance Port-Olry has  "fog, mist" where Hog-Harbour has .

Unless otherwise indicated, examples given here are in the Northern, Port-Olry, dialect.

Phonology

In addition, Sakao has a close vowel  that is unspecified for being rounded or unrounded, front or back, and is always unstressed. It also has the two diphthongs , whereas Tolomako has none.

In addition, Sakao consonants may be long or short:  "drum",  "bed"

It is not clear if Sakao even has syllables; that is, whether trying to divide Sakao words into meaningful syllables is even possible. If it is, Sakao syllables would appear to be V (a vowel or diphthong) surrounded by any number of consonants: V  "thou", CCVCCCC (?)  "having sung and stopped singing thou kept silent" [ 2nd pers.,  "to sing",  perfective,  continuous].

Grammar

Number
Like Tolomako, Sakao distinguishes four numbers for its personal pronouns. However, they are not singular, dual, trial, plural, but singular, dual, paucal, plural. The Sakao paucal derives from the Tolomako trial, thus Tolomako i γire-tolu "they three", Sakao jørðœl "they, from three to ten" (ðœl is regularly derivable from tolu). One says in Sakao jørðœl løn "the five of them" which is, etymologically, "they three, five."

Substantives are not inflected for number, except kinship terms which distinguish singular and plural:  "my mother/aunt,"  "my aunts;"  "my child,"  "my children." Likewise all demonstratives (pronouns, adjectives, even locatives):  "this one,"   "these ones;"  "this person,"  "these persons;"  "here,"  "in several places around here."

Deixis
Sakao has seven degrees of deixis.

Nouns
Sakao has inalienably possessed nouns, many of which are irregularly inflected:

Here "mouth" is variably  and "hair" variably .

Syntax
Sakao has a suffix  that increases the valence of a verb (corresponding to applicative suffixes in other languages): it makes intransitive verbs transitive, and transitive verbs ditransitive. It the latter case, one argument may be the direct object and the other an instrument; the word order of the arguments is free, leaving context to disambiguate which is which:

This could also be .

The Sakao strategy involves polysynthetic syntax, as opposed to the isolating syntax of its neighbor Tolomako. For instance, the word 'pig' above could be incorporated into the verb, leaving a single external argument:

Sakao polysynthesis can also involve compound verbs, each with its own instrument or object:

Here  "the bow" is the instrumental argument of  "to shoot", and  "the sea" is the direct object of  "to follow", which since they are combined into a single verb, are marked as ditransitive with the suffix .

Tolomako language, for parallels to the above in a closely related but grammatically simpler language

References

External links 
 ELAR archive of N'kep dialect of Sakao (north Vanuatu): Structure and variation
 Paradisec has two collections of Arthur Cappell's (AC1, AC2) that include Sakao language materials

Languages of Vanuatu
Espiritu Santo languages